Stefan Traykov (born 9 July 1976) is a Bulgarian footballer, who currently plays as a midfielder for Juventus Malchika.

Career
Traykov was raised in Akademik Svishtov's youth teams. In his career he played also for Etar Veliko Tarnovo, Chernomorets Burgas, Marek Dupnitsa and Ravda 1954.

References

External links
 

1976 births
Living people
Bulgarian footballers
First Professional Football League (Bulgaria) players
PFC Chernomorets Burgas players
FC Chernomorets Burgas players
PFC Marek Dupnitsa players
PFC Akademik Svishtov players
Association football midfielders
People from Svishtov
Sportspeople from Veliko Tarnovo Province